Chümoukedima is a municipality in Nagaland, India.

Chümoukedima may also refer to:

 Chümoukedima district, a district of Nagaland, India
 Chümoukedima Metropolitan Area, the Chümoukedima metropolis

See also